YST may refer to:

 Yolk sac tumor
 Youth Sport Trust
 Yukon Standard Time
 St. Theresa Point Airport, St. Theresa Point, Manitoba, Canada
 Yamaha Sound Technologies Inc. - see Yamaha Corporation
 Yoroiden Samurai Troopers, originating name of Japanese animated television series Ronin Warriors